Davallia denticulata is a widespread species of fern. Often seen as a lithophyte or epiphyte in different forest types. It may lose all its fronds in dry periods.

References

External links 
 Davallia denticulata at Tropicos

Davalliaceae
Flora of Queensland
Flora of tropical Asia
Flora of Africa
Flora of China
Plants described in 1768
Taxa named by Nicolaas Laurens Burman